Third-seeded pair Beverly Mould and Paula Smith claimed the title by defeating second-seeds Elise Burgin and JoAnne Russell in the final.

Seeds
A champion seed is indicated in bold text while text in italics indicates the round in which that seed was eliminated.

Draw

Finals

Top half

Bottom half

External links

U.S. Clay Court Championships
1984 U.S. Clay Court Championships